The Church of the Holy Virgin Mary The Queen of Poland (Polish: Kościół Najświętszej Maryi Panny Królowej Polski) is located in Słubice, a small town in Słubice County, in Lubusz Voivodeship, in Poland. It belongs to the Roman Catholic Church. The building which dates back to 1775 and served as a rifle range was adapted to its present use after World War II, when Słubice became a part of the Polish territory.

Słubice County
Słubice
18th-century Roman Catholic church buildings in Poland
Roman Catholic churches completed in 1775